Deadman's Island or Deadmans Island can refer to several different locations:

Canada

 Deadman's Island in Vancouver's Coal Harbour
 Deadman's Island in the Northwest Arm of Halifax Harbour
 the original name for Halkett Island, in Victoria's Inner Harbour
 Deadman's Island and the former Deadman's Island Provincial Park, now part of Burns Lake Provincial Park in the town of Burns Lake, British Columbia

United States
 Deadman's Island, a now-vanished island near San Pedro, Los Angeles, California

United Kingdom
 Deadman's Island, an island in the estuary of the River Medway

See also
Dead Man's Chest Island (disambiguation)
Deadman Islands, Nunavut, Canada
Deadman River